USS Marengo (AK-194) was an  that was constructed by the US Navy during the closing period of World War II. She was declared excess-to-needs and returned to the US Maritime Commission shortly after commissioning.

Construction
Marengo (AK 194) was laid down under a Maritime Commission contract, MC hull 2125, by Walter Butler Shipbuilders Inc., Superior, Wisconsin, 4 July 1944; launched 4 December 1944; sponsored by Mrs. R. W. Higgins; acquired by the Navy at New Orleans, Louisiana, 24 August 1945; placed in service the same day she was acquired, and was used for ferrying from Beaumont, Texas, to Galveston, Texas. She was placed out of service on arrival the 29 August; and commissioned 21 September.

Post-war decommissioning
The end of World War Il reduced the need for cargo ships, so Marengo decommissioned 23 November and was transferred to War Shipping Administration (WSA) the same day. The ship was subsequently operated by North Atlantic & Gulf Steamship Co., under the name Coastal Spartan.

Merchant service
Coastal Spartan was contracted to North Atlantic & Gulf SS Company and South Atlantic SS Line until being laid up in the reserve fleet in Wilmington, North Carolina, on 22 April 1948.

She was sold to Boston Metals, Company, on 19 July 1965, for non-transportation use.

In December 1971, she was sold to Storm Drilling Company, and converted to a drilling ship. She was renamed Cyclone on 30 December 1971. She was again converted in 1975, to a crane ship and renamed Ocean Cyclone.

She was sold in 1989, converted by the Eastern Shipbuilding Company, Panama City, Florida, to a fish processing vessel in 1989–1990.

In late 1999, she was acquired by Icicle Seafoods, Inc.

Notes 

Citations

Bibliography 

Online resources

External links

 

Alamosa-class cargo ships
Marengo County, Alabama
Ships built in Superior, Wisconsin
1944 ships
World War II auxiliary ships of the United States